NGC 1985 (also known as 2MASS J05374779+3159200) is a small, bright reflection nebula located in the constellation Auriga. It was discovered by William Herschel on December 13, 1790. It has an apparent magnitude of 12.8 and its size is 0.68.

References

reflection nebulae
2MASS J05374779+3159200
1985
Auriga (constellation)
Astronomical objects discovered in 1790
Discoveries by William Herschel